Amos Tuck (August 2, 1810 – December 11, 1879) was an American attorney and politician in New Hampshire and a founder of the Republican Party.

Early life and education
Born in Parsonsfield, Maine, August 2, 1810, the son of John Tuck, a sixth-generation descendant of Robert Tuck, a founder of Hampton, New Hampshire, in 1638. Tuck attended Effingham Academy and Hampton Academy and graduated from Dartmouth College in 1835. He studied law and passed the bar.

Career 
Tuck was an early supporter and donor to the Free Will Baptist's Parsonfield Seminary. He is the namesake of the Tuck School of Business at Dartmouth. He was a leading citizen of Exeter, New Hampshire, for 40 years and played an important part in Exeter's history between 1838 - 1879.

In his youth, Tuck came to Hampton and from 1836 to 1838 was Headmaster of the Hampton Academy founded by his ancestors. He was admitted to the bar in 1838 and commenced practice in Exeter. He later became a trustee of Dartmouth College. After leaving politics, Tuck was commissioned as a Naval officer of the port of Boston from 1861 to 1865. Following the American Civil War, he resumed the practice of law and also engaged in railroad building, at which he gained significant success and wealth.

Political career
Tuck was elected to the New Hampshire House of Representatives in 1842 as a member of the Democratic Party but broke with pro-slavery Democratic leaders in 1844 and was formally cast out of the party. He ran for Congress, anyway, and was elected as an Independent to the Thirtieth Congress. 
 
In 1845 he called a convention to form an independent movement in favor of anti-slavery Congressional Candidate John P. Hale. This convention would later be identified as "the nucleus of the Republican Party." During the months following the convention (which was described by Tuck as "respectable in numbers and unparalleled in spirit") Tuck worked tenaciously to grow his young party. His hard work and enthusiasm resulted in the successful election of Hale in 1846.

Tuck himself ran as a Free-Soil candidate to the Thirty-first Congress, and as a Whig to the Thirty-second Congress (March 4, 1847 – March 3, 1853). After three consecutive terms he returned to Exeter in 1853 and began a movement to unite the many minor political factions that existed in the state of New Hampshire.

Founder of the Republican Party in New Hampshire

Tuck organized a secret meeting, on October 12, 1853, at Major Blake's Hotel in Exeter of a group of anti-slavery men. Tuck suggested they form a party to be called "Republicans." The term "Republican party" had been widely used in New Hampshire politics in the 1830s. The dinner is commemorated by the tablet now affixed to the Squamscott House in Exeter. The participants campaigned for several parties in 1854 state elections, but the Republican party did not run a ticket that year in the state. He helped form the state Republican party in 1856 and was a delegate to the Republican National Conventions in 1856 and 1860. Tuck was appointed a delegate to the peace convention held in Washington, D.C., in 1861 in an effort to devise means to prevent the impending war.

He was a personal friend of Abraham Lincoln, John Greenleaf Whittier and many other men prominent in his time, and is said to be responsible for putting Lincoln in office. "Lincoln...would never have realized his goals," according to Dartmouth historian Professor Frank Smallwood, "if his old friend, Amos Tuck of Exeter, New Hampshire...had not played such an influential role in helping him to secure the Republican party's presidential nomination in 1860."

Personal life
Tuck married Davida Nudd and had a son, Edward Tuck, on August 25, 1842, and a daughter, Ellen Tuck French, who married Francis Ormond French, President of the Manhattan Trust Company.

Tuck died in Exeter, New Hampshire, on December 11, 1879. He was interred in Exeter Cemetery.

His son, Edward Tuck, financed and founded at Dartmouth College the Amos Tuck School of Business Administration, and funded the New Hampshire Historical Society building, a "beautiful" granite structure in Concord, New Hampshire.

Family and political descendants founded the Amos Tuck Society to promote and spread the history of Tuck's contributions and founding of the Republican Party. Edward Tuck also graduate from, and become a major donor to, Dartmouth College. He made his fortune in banking, railroads and international trade, becoming vice-consul to France.

See also
New Hampshire Historical Marker No. 240: Abraham Lincoln Speaks in New Hampshire

References

Further reading
Sewell, Richard H. John P. Hale and the Politics of Abolition (1965)
Marston, Philip W. Amos Tuck and the Beginning in New Hampshire of the Republican Party Historical New Hampshire (1960)
Corning, Charles R[obert]. "Amos Tuck" . Exeter, N.H.: The News-letter Press, 1902.
Dearborn, Jeremiah Wadleigh "Sketch of the life and character of Hon. Amos Tuck" read before the Maine Historical Society, December, 1888 . [Portland, Maine: Printed by B. Thurston & Co., 1888?]
Page, Elwin L. "Abraham Lincoln in New Hampshire", Monitor Publishing Company, 2009. 
Gregg, Hugh. "Birth of the Republican Party : a summary of historical research on Amos Tuck and the birthplace of the Republican Party at Exeter, New Hampshire" . Compiled by Hugh Gregg and Georgi Hippauf. Nashua, N.H.: Resources of New Hampshire, 1995.

External links
 

Accession of the Amos Tuck Society to the Political Library
"An old family of Hampton (the Tucks)" 
About Tuck - Our History
New Hampshire Political Library
Seacoast Online "Republicans Party Down October 28, 2003

1810 births
1879 deaths
American railway entrepreneurs
Dartmouth College alumni
Members of the New Hampshire House of Representatives
Members of the United States House of Representatives from New Hampshire
American abolitionists
New Hampshire Free Soilers
New Hampshire lawyers
New Hampshire Republicans
New Hampshire Whigs
American people of English descent
People from Exeter, New Hampshire
Tuck School of Business people
New Hampshire Democrats
New Hampshire Independents
Independent members of the United States House of Representatives
Free Soil Party members of the United States House of Representatives
Whig Party members of the United States House of Representatives
19th-century American politicians
People from Parsonsfield, Maine
Activists from New Hampshire
19th-century American lawyers
19th-century American businesspeople